is located in the Kitami Mountains, Hokkaidō, Japan. The peak marks the border of Takinoui, Monbetsu, and Engaru. It is the source of the Tatsuushi River.

References

Kitami Fuji